Sycopsis is a genus of plants in the family Hamamelidaceae native to southern central China and Taiwan.

Characteristics
Sycopsis are evergreen or semi-evergreen shrubs or small trees. Their leaves are leathery and their flowers have no petals.

Species
The genus Sycopsis contains two species: Sycopsis sinensis and Sycopsis triplinerva.

Etymology and naming
Sycopsis is derived from Greek and means ‘fig-resembler’ because the person who named the genus, Daniel Oliver, thought its appearance resembled a shrubby Ficus.

The Chinese vernacular name for this genus is 水丝梨属 (Shuǐ sī lí shǔ).

References

Flora of China
Flora of Taiwan
Endemic flora of China
Hamamelidaceae
Saxifragales genera